The men's featherweight (64 kilograms) event at the 1986 Asian Games took place on 1 October 1986 at Sungkyunkwan University, Seoul, South Korea.

A total of ten competitors competed in this event, limited to fighters whose body weight was less than 64 kilograms.

Schedule
All times are Korea Standard Time (UTC+09:00)

Results 
Legend
KO — Won by knockout

References

External links
Medalists
Results

Taekwondo at the 1986 Asian Games